Volodymyr Panteleimonovych Bahaziy (1902 — 21 February 1942) was a Ukrainian nationalist affiliated with Andriy Melnyk who was head of Kyiv City Administration under German occupation from October 1941 to February 1942.

Biography 
In September 1941, when the Germans occupied Kyiv, Oleksandr Ohloblyn who knew him for years invited him at the meeting where representatives of Organization of Ukrainian Nationalists associated with Andriy Melnyk formed the new Kyiv city administration. Although Bahaziy was supported by a large group, the OUN representatives mistrusted him and agreed to appoint him a deputy to Ohloblyn who became the city mayor. Very soon, however, Bahaziy gained the favour of both OUN people (for his active participation in the activities of the Ukrainian National Council) and the German military leaders. Claims that he was personally present during the execution of Jews in Babi Yar were later proven to be untrue. In October 1941, Ohloblyn retired and Bahaziy was appointed the new mayor of Kyiv.

As mayor of Kyiv, Bahaziy encountered the bitter opposition of Erich Koch, the brutal Nazi administrator of Reichskommissariat Ukraine. At a speech before journalists Bahaziy praised OUN leaders and proclaimed that "the eyes of all Ukrainians are turned toward Melnyk." A German officer begged the journalists not to disseminate this remark for fear of inflaming Nazi authorities.  In January 1942, Bahaziy was arrested and accused of various crimes, including threatening the pro-Russian bishop of Kyiv, theft of German property in order to aid the Ukrainian nationalist cause, being a leader of the Melnykite wing of the OUN, and attempting to secure the control of the Ukrainian police. He was soon after executed in Babi Yar along with other Ukrainian nationalists, although his wife was left unaware of his death and kept bringing him packages to Kyiv prison until summer 1942.

References 

 Київська влада під німецькою окупацією — in Ukrainian.
 О. Кучерук. Чин Володимира Багазія (ч. 1)
 О. Кучерук. Чин Володимира Багазія (ч. 2)
 О. Кучерук. Чин Володимира Багазія (ч. 3)

1902 births
1942 deaths
People from Khmelnytskyi Oblast
People from Kamenets-Podolsky Uyezd
Organization of Ukrainian Nationalists politicians
Mayors of Kyiv
Ukrainian nationalists
Ukrainian people of World War II
Ukrainian politicians before 1991
Reichskommissariat Ukraine
History of Kyiv
Ukrainian people executed by Nazi Germany